Piezo is derived from the Greek πιέζω, which means to squeeze or press, and may refer to:

 PIEZO1, a mechanosensitive ion protein
 Piezoelectric pickups for guitars and other musical instruments
 Piezoelectric sensor, a device that converts differences in physical force to generate voltage
 Piezoelectric speaker, a type of small loudspeaker
 Piezoelectricity, electrical charge built up in response to mechanical stress
 Piezometer, a device that measures the pressure of groundwater at a certain point
 Piezoresistive effect, a change in the electrical resistance of a material in response to mechanical stress
 Piezorina, a genus of South American bird
 Micro Piezo, a print head technology developed by Epson
 Piezo ignition, an ignition method based on the piezoelectric effect

See also
 
 
 Pez (disambiguation)
 Pie (disambiguation)